German submarine U-485 was a Type VIIC U-boat of Nazi Germany's Kriegsmarine during World War II.

She carried out three patrols. She sank no ships.

U-485 surrendered in Gibraltar on 12 May 1945; she was sunk as part of Operation Deadlight, north of Ireland on 8 December 1945.

Design
German Type VIIC submarines were preceded by the shorter Type VIIB submarines. U-485 had a displacement of  when at the surface and  while submerged. She had two shafts and two  propellers.

U-485 was fitted with five  torpedo tubes (four fitted at the bow and one at the stern), fourteen torpedoes, one  SK C/35 naval gun, (220 rounds), one  Flak M42 and two twin  C/30 anti-aircraft guns. The boat had a complement of between forty-four and sixty.

Service history
The submarine was laid down on 3 May 1943 at the Deutsche Werke in Kiel as yard number 320, launched on 15 January 1944 and commissioned on 23 February under the command of Kapitänleutnant Friedrich Lutz.

She served with the 5th U-boat Flotilla from 23 February 1944 for training and the 11th flotilla from 1 November for operations.

First patrol
U-485s first patrol was preceded by short journeys from Kiel in Germany to Horten Naval Base (south of Oslo) and then Bergen, both in Norway. The patrol itself began when the boat departed Bergen on 29 November 1944. She proceeded west of the Shetland Islands on 4 December and west of Ireland on the 14th. She entered the English Channel and was northwest of the Channel Islands on the 21st. The furthest east that she travelled was to a point south of Brighton, which she reached on 5 January 1945. She then retraced her route via the Scilly Isles; she returned to Bergen on 30 January.

Second patrol
The submarine had moved to Trondheim from where she departed on her second patrol on 25 March 1945. Her route took her through the gap between Iceland and the Faroe Islands. She docked at La Pallice in France on 24 April.

Third patrol, surrender and fate
Leaving La Pallice on 29 April 1945, the boat surrendered in Gibraltar on 12 May, four days after Germany's capitulation. She was transferred to Loch Ryan in Scotland for Operation Deadlight and was sunk by unknown causes on 8 December north of Ireland.

References

Bibliography

External links

German Type VIIC submarines
U-boats commissioned in 1944
U-boats sunk in 1945
1944 ships
Ships built in Kiel
Operation Deadlight
World War II submarines of Germany
Maritime incidents in December 1945